Red Hill is a mountain located in the Catskill Mountains of New York east-south of Frost Valley. Woodhull Mountain is located northeast of Red Hill.

References

Mountains of Ulster County, New York
Mountains of New York (state)